In Islamic belief, Maalik denotes an angel in Hell/Purgatory who administrates the Hellfire, assisted by 19 mysterious guards (Sura 74:30) known as Zabaniyya. In the Qur'an, Maalik is mentioned in Sura  as the chief of angels of hell. The earliest codices offer various alternative spellings of this word including , meaning "angel", instead of a proper name.

In Qur'an 
In  and the following, the Qur'an describes Maalik telling the people in hell that they must remain there: "Surely, the disbelievers will be in the torment of hell to abide therein forever. [The torment] will not be lightened for them, and they will be plunged into destruction with deep regrets, sorrows and in despair therein. We wronged them not, but they were the wrongdoers. And they will cry: 'O Malik! Let your Lord make an end of us!' He will say: 'Surely, you shall abide forever.' Indeed we have brought the truth to you, but most of you have a hatred for the truth."  points out, that the punishments are carried out by God's command: "O you who believe! Save yourselves and your families from a fire [Jahannam] whose fuel is men and stones, over which are [appointed] angels stern and severe, who flinch not [from executing] the commands they receive from God, but do [precisely] what they are commanded".

In Muhammad's Night Journey 

According to Islamic tradition, Muhammad met the angel Maalik during his heavenly journey. Therefore, Muhammad arrived in heaven and all the angels greeted him with a smile except Maalik. When Muhammad asked Jibra'il, why he remains taciturn therefore, he reveals Maalik as the guardian of Hell who never smiles. After that, Muhammad asked him to show Hell and Maalik opened its gates, showing him a glimpse of suffering for the inmates.

See also
 List of angels in theology
 Abaddon
 Malik
 Moloch
 Ridwan
 Yama

References

Angels in Islam
Individual angels
Jahannam